Loxton House is a heritage-listed former residence and now restaurant located at 142-144 Bridge Street, Muswellbrook in the Muswellbrook Shire local government area of New South Wales, Australia. It was built in 1838 and was added to the New South Wales State Heritage Register on 2 April 1999.

History 
In January 1980 Muswellbrook Council requested comments from the Heritage Council regarding proposed renovations of Loxton House.

In March 1980 the Heritage Council recommended that an Interim Conservation Order be placed over the building as it was concerned that full compliance with Ordinance 70 of the Local Government Act would require an unacceptable sacrifice of the architectural integrity of the building. Non-compliance with the relevant provisions would not unduly affect its fire safety.

Following concurrence with the Minister for Local Government with the proposal an Interim Heritage Order was placed over the building. In recognition of its heritage significance a Permanent Conservation Order was placed over Loxton House on 8 January 1982. It was transferred to the State Heritage Register on 2 April 1999.

Description 
The front facade is stone with projecting quoins and an upper verandah supported on fluted timber columns. The side walls are stuccoed brick and the rear wall is painted brick. The rear elevation also has a two-story verandah. The roof is iron over shingles. Joinery is cedar and floors are pit-sawn timber boards. Internally the building retains much of its original cedar joinery including a staircase with carved handrail.

Modifications and dates 
Major modifications include:
1980restoration/conversion for use as a restaurant in the basement. Shops on the ground floor and offices on the first floor.
1987approval granted for repaving of basement courtyard.
1992approval granted for repair of timber posts and repainting exterior.

Heritage listing 

As at 3 October 2000, Loxton House, built  is a key building in the main street of Muswellbrook. It is a two-storey Colonial-Georgian building which is believed to be Muswellbrook's oldest remaining building.

Loxton House was listed on the New South Wales State Heritage Register on 2 April 1999.

See also 

Australian residential architectural styles

References

Bibliography

Attribution 

New South Wales State Heritage Register
Muswellbrook
Restaurants in New South Wales
Houses in New South Wales
Articles incorporating text from the New South Wales State Heritage Register